Grim Reaper is a fictional character and a superhero. Created by writer/editor Richard E. Hughes, he first appeared in Fighting Yank #7 (Feb 1944), and was quickly promoted to cover feature of Wonder Comics (Better Publications), beginning with #1 (May 1944). His origin story was told in Wonder Comics #2.

The character was revived in the modern age in Tom Strong #11 by Alan Moore and Chris Sprouse. He was killed by The Terror in the Terra Obscura miniseries.

Character history
Bill Norris is studying at the Sorbonne in Paris, France when the Nazis occupy the city. Intervening in a Nazi harassment of a citizen, Norris is arrested and sent to a concentration camp. He helps an old man, who eventually confides to Norris that he's the leader of the French Underground and knows the location of an important French General, who has to be safely brought to Africa to continue the battle. Fashioning an all black Grim Reaper outfit, Norris, with help from the French citizenry, rescues the General. The Reaper regularly kills his Nazi foes with his bare hands.

He is, at one point, number one on the Gestapo's wanted list.

The Grim Reaper is often shown working behind enemy lines in the German underground. The Reaper makes his way to England in Wonder Comics #4.

In one adventure, the Reaper brings an armored Nazi super-zeppelin to England and wants nothing more than to go back to the continent: "The only reward I want is a chance to fight the Nazi beasts again and again... to spread terror among the foulest terrorists the world has ever known! Tremble, you Nazis! The Grim Reaper is coming back!"

After the war ended, Norris returned to America in Wonder Comics #8 (Oct 1946), and continued his superheroics. He battled Mr. Meek, the Robed Phantom, the Chameleon and the Crying Bandit. His final story was published in Wonder Comics #17 (April 1948).

Revivals

America's Best Comics
The Grim Reaper, along with other heroes from Nedor Comics, were revived by Alan Moore in his series Tom Strong. This revival set the characters on a parallel world called Terra Obscura, which was also the title of the resulting mini-series.

This Reaper eventually opposed the goals of the revived Black Terror and was killed, during his own unsuccessful attempt to put an end to the Terror.

Powers and abilities
The Grim Reaper has no superhuman powers, but in the Golden Age, he used guns and a sword to fight Nazis. When revived by ABC, his sword could project electromagnetic blasts.

In other media 
A different variation of Grim Reaper appears in the two season seven episodes of Arrow, portrayed by John DeSantis. This version is an unnamed criminal who started to work for Ricardo Diaz's criminal organisation acting as his inside man at Slabside Maximum Security prison. His nickname comes from the tattoo on his neck. In "Inmate 4587", he begins to attack Oliver Queen with other goons as per Diaz's order. Later, Oliver Queen went to prison's courtyard beating up both Danny Brickwell and "Grim Reaper" prisoner as payback. In "The Demon", this prisoner is later placed in Level Two of the prison, where he was experimented and tortured for weeks by Slabside's corrupt chief psychiatrist Jarrett Parker, losing his sense of identity and turning him into a shell of his former self. After he was subjected to another Parker's treatment, "Grim Reaper" died due to the stress.

See also
Tom Strong
Terra Obscura
Nedor Comics
SMASH

References

External links
Grim Reaper at Golden Age Superheroes
Grim Reaper at the International Catalog of Superheroes

American superheroes
Characters created by Richard E. Hughes
Comics characters introduced in 1944
Fictional personifications of death
Fictional swordfighters in comics
Fictional World War II veterans
Golden Age superheroes
Nedor Comics superheroes
Vigilante characters in comics